Soul Sphere is the fourth studio album by American progressive metalcore band Born of Osiris. The album was released on October 23, 2015 through Sumerian Records.

Critical reception

In a critical review for Exclaim!, Calum Slingerland wrote that Soul Sphere was closer to capturing the band's prior virtuosic pursuits than Tomorrow We Die ∆live, though he further criticized the EDM influence and below-average lyricism.

Track listing

Personnel
 Ronnie Canizaro – lead vocals
 Lee McKinney – guitars
 David Da Rocha – bass
 Joe Buras – keyboards, synthesizers, backing vocals
 Cameron Losch – drums

Charts

References

2015 albums
Born of Osiris albums
Sumerian Records albums